Västerdalälven (literally West Dal River) is a 300 km long river in Sweden that flows southeast through Dalarna. Its sources are Görälven and Fuluälven and the end point is Djurås, in the municipality of Gagnef, where it connects with Österdalälven to form Dalälven. The annual open water swimming competition Vansbrosimningen takes place in Vanån (2000 m) and Västerdal River (1000 m).

References

Rivers of Dalarna County
Dalarna
Dalälven basin